Glens Falls is a city in Warren County, New York, United States and is the central city of the Glens Falls Metropolitan Statistical Area. The population was 14,700 at the 2010 census. The name was given by Colonel Johannes Glen, the falls referring to a large waterfall in the Hudson River at the southern end of the city.

Glens Falls is a city in the southeastern corner of Warren County, surrounded by the town of Queensbury to the north, east, and west, and by the Hudson River and Saratoga County to the south. Glens Falls is known as "Hometown U.S.A.", a title Look Magazine gave it in 1944. The city has also referred to itself as the "Empire City."

History
As a halfway point between Fort Edward and Fort William Henry, the falls was the site of several battles during the French and Indian War and the Revolutionary War. The then-hamlet was mostly destroyed by fire twice during the latter conflict, forcing the Quakers to abandon the settlement until the war ended in 1783. Fire also ravaged the village in 1864, 1884, and 1902.

The area was originally called Chepontuc (Iroquois; "difficult place to get around"), also referred to as the "Great Carrying Place," but was renamed "The Corners" by European-American settlers. In 1766 it was renamed Wing's Falls for Abraham Wing – the leader of the group of Quakers who established the permanent settlement – and for the falls on the Hudson River. Wing's claim to the name of the falls and the hamlet was transferred to Colonel Johannes Glen of Schenectady in 1788, either on collection of a debt, as a result of a game of cards, or in exchange for hosting a party for mutual friends, depending on which local legend is believed. Colonel Glen changed the name to "Glen's Falls," though it was often printed with varying spelling such as "Glenn's," or "Glens". The spelling "Glens Falls" came to be the common usage.

A post office was established in 1808. Glens Falls became an incorporated village in 1839, and was re-incorporated in 1874 and 1887, expanding the village to what would become the city limits when the state legislature granted the city charter in 1908, at which time the city became independent from the town of Queensbury.

The land, known as Veterans Field or the Northway Industrial Park, is on Veterans Road between Luzerne Road and Sherman Avenue and is just east of I-87. The land was vacant at the time. A thin,  strip of Sherman Avenue was part of this annexation, to comply with state law on contiguity of annexed land. As a result, the city and town share co-own this stretch of highway.

Historic sites

Glens Falls has two historic districts listed on the National Register of Historic Places and the equivalent New York State Register of Historic places. The Fredella Avenue historic district includes a series of unique concrete block structures. The Three Squares Historic District makes up most of the Central Business District. In addition, several individual structures are listed, some below. Glens Falls does not have a local preservation law protecting these historic resources from demolition or alteration.

Crandall Public Library – While the library has existed since 1893, it did not have a permanent home until 1931, with the completion of the library building in City Park, on property local entrepreneur Henry Crandall willed to the library. Charles A. Platt designed the building and Robert Rheinlander built it; it was renovated and expanded in 1969. The city completed the building's first renovation and expansion, involving the demolition of the 1969 addition, in November 2008. The library is a part of the Southern Adirondack Library System.
Civil War Monument – A limestone obelisk at the intersection of Glen, South, and Bay streets, the monument was dedicated in 1872 to honor the 644 men from Queensbury who served in the Civil War. Ninety-five names, those of the men who died, are engraved on the monument. Many battles of the war are listed.
DeLong House – Presently the home of the Glens Falls/Queensbury Historical Association and the Chapman Historical Museum, it is a Greek Revival and Second Empire edifice on the corner of Glen and Bacon Streets. A Queen Anne style carriage barn is part of the property.
The Feeder Canal – Across from this historic canal is a hydro-electric power-plant on the Hudson River at Glens Falls. The canal was created circa 1820 to feed water into the Champlain Canal. During the early 19th century, the New York State Canal System was crucial to the development of the state's economy. Lime, marble, lumber, and agricultural commodities were shipped between Glens Falls and the docks at the base of Canal Street.
First Presbyterian Church – The congregation was chartered in 1803; its fifth house of worship was constructed in 1929. It was designed by Ralph Adams Cram in his "presbyterian style" of neo-gothic architecture.
Fort Amherst Road – Located near this road is the site of the former Fort Amherst. While the fort no longer exists, parts of the wood foundations were known as late as 1880. The fort constituted a block house marking the halfway point on the road between Fort Edward and Fort William Henry at the head of Lake George. This fort system, erected by the British, was built to secure the colony's northern territories from French incursions during the French and Indian War. A restored fort house complex is available for viewing in the nearby town of Fort Ann.
Louis Fiske Hyde House – The center among a triplet of revival-type residences constructed for the daughters of Samuel Pruyn by the architects Robert Rheinlander and Henry Forbes Bigelow, Hyde House houses The Hyde Collection, a world-class museum of European, American, and contemporary art. The principal collection is presented in its original domestic context as a private collection.
The Oldest Building in Glens Falls – In 1864, a massive fire destroyed most of buildings in the central business district. The oldest building in Glens Falls, in the downtown area, is one of the few buildings in the city that antedates 1864. The stone and brick structure at the bottom of the hill was erected circa 1815 and served as Calvin Robbin's blacksmith shop.
Quaker Meeting House – Built in 1875, the Quaker Meeting House, an Italianate edifice on Ridge Street, originally did not have a heating system.
St. Mary-St. Alphonsus Regional Catholic School – Formerly known as St. Mary's Academy, the school is on the corner of Warren and Church streets. It is in the neo-Gothic style of architecture and designed by Ralph Adams Cram. The building is listed on the National Register of Historic Places. It features a Great Hall with a two-story stained glass window designed by Henry Lee Willett Studios of Philadelphia.
A New York State historical marker referencing American Modernist painter Wilhelmina Weber Furlong was placed near City Hall in 2013, during the Warren County Bicentennial. Furlong spent about a decade at the end of her life living and teaching in Glens Falls.

Geography and climate

The city is on the Hudson River, in the Adirondack foothills, at the border of Saratoga County.

Demographics

As of the census of 2010, there were 14,707 people, 6,548 households, and 3,529 families residing in the city. The population density was 3685.97 inhabitants per square mile (1423.72/km2). There were 7,112 housing units at an average density of 1782.46 per square mile (688.48/km2). The racial makeup of the city was 94.7% White, 1.8% African American, 0.3% Native American, 0.6% Asian, 0.4% from other races, and 2.3% from two or more races. Hispanic or Latino people of any race were 2.3% of the population.

There were 6,548 households, out of which 26.0% had children under the age of 18 living with them, 34.0% were married couples living together, 14.4% had a female householder with no husband present, and 46.1% were non-families. 36.2% of all households were made up of individuals, and 10.7% had someone living alone who was 65 years of age or older. The average household size was 2.22 and the average family size was 2.91.

In the city, the population was spread out, with 24.3% under the age of 20, 6.8% from 20 to 24, 29.5% from 25 to 44, 27.1% from 45 to 64, and 12.5% who were 65 years of age or older. The median age was 37.6 years. For every 100 females, there were 94.3 males. For every 100 females age 20 and over, there were 90.9 males.

The median income for a household in the city was estimated for 2016 at $46,305, and the median income for a family at $60,545. Males had a median income of $41,993 versus $37,988 for females.  About 12.6% of families and 16% of the population were below the poverty line, including 23.9% of those under age 18 and 8% of those age 65 or over.

Finance and industry 

The Glens Falls region is a major producer of medical devices. Glens Falls is home to Navilyst Medical, a medical device maker, previously a regional office of Pfizer and Boston Scientific Corporation. Glens Falls is also a principal provider of medical services for a vast  region from Saratoga County to the south, extending northward to the central Adirondacks. These services are centered around the Glens Falls Hospital, a 410-bed facility downtown. Founded in the summer of 1897 by a group of twelve local physicians, the Glens Falls Hospital was meant to serve the entire Upper Hudson River Valley. Solomon A. Parks donated his home in Glens Falls for the original hospital. The present structure has been extensively modified, enlarged, and modernized several times to better serve the needs of the community, and it is the region's fast-response trauma center. The hospital is now the area's biggest employer. A VA outpatient facility serves veterans' medical needs.

Danfloss Flomatic Corporation is headquartered on Pruyn's Island in Glens Falls. The company is a leading manufacturer of industrial and municipal valves. Also on Pruyn's Island is Umicore, a Belgium-based company manufacturing silver-based contact materials.

Finch Paper LLC, headquartered at the base of Glen Street hill, is a major regional employer and a manufacturer of specialty paper and forest products. It is by far the largest taxpayer in the City of Glens Falls, owning property assessed at $60-million in 2006, according to city records. In mid-June 2007, Finch Pruyn & Company announced it had sold all of its assets, including  of forestland in the Adirondacks, to Atlas Holdings of Greenwich, Conn. The Company name was then changed to Finch Paper LLC. Atlas then sold all of the forestland to The Nature Conservancy.

The Glens Falls Cement company, established 1893, is now a part of Lehigh Northeast, itself a division of HeidelbergCement, one of the world's largest cement producers.

Glens Falls has an old and prevalent history in the region's finance sector. Arrow Financial Corporation, headquartered downtown, is a publicly traded multi-bank holding company for Glens Falls National Bank & Trust Company (1851) and Saratoga National Bank and Trust Company. Evergreen Bank, N.A., formerly the First National Bank of Glens Falls, originated in 1853, and is now owned by banking conglomerate TD Banknorth. Advantage Capital Partners, a venture capital firm, has its New York offices downtown.

Culture, media and entertainment

Arts and theater
The Greater Glens Falls area has a rich history of theatrical productions. The 300-seat Charles R. Wood Theater is home to the Adirondack Theater Festival (ATF), a professional non-profit summer theatre presenting new and contemporary plays and musicals. 

In addition to ATF, the Wood Theater provides numerous artistic and cultural presentations throughout the year. This theater opened in 2003 on Glen Street, in the heart of Glens Falls. A former Woolworth store, it now introduces culture and theater into the surrounding community. The theater is named for Mr. Wood, a successful local entrepreneur and founder of The Great Escape theme park, in Queensbury. The Glens Falls Community Theatre has produced theatrical productions in Glens Falls for nearly 75 years.

The Lower Adirondack Regional Arts Council (LARAC) promotes the arts in the Glens Falls region, hosting an annual arts festival and maintaining a gallery open year-round at the Lapham Carriage House next to City Park.

Music in Glens Falls is highlighted by the city's professional orchestra, the Glens Falls Symphony, which has been performing classical repertoire for 30 years. The orchestra is under the direction of Maestro Charles Peltz. From 1965 through 1997, Glens Falls was home to the Lake George Opera Festival, a professional company that staged several productions each summer. The company moved to nearby Saratoga Springs and is now Opera Saratoga.

Glens Falls has three museums. The Hyde Collection is a world class European and American art collection situated in its original home context with modern gallery spaces. The Chapman Historical Museum is operated by the Glens Falls/Queensbury Historical Association and offers local history exhibits, educational programs, and tours of the historic DeLong House. The World Awareness Children's Museum is a children's museum focused on cultural diversity.

Art in the Public Eye (APE) is a non-profit arts organization. Its mission is to cultivate a partnership between the area arts community and local businesses, to promote established and emerging artists and local commerce, and to create greater access to the arts through cultural activities and public exhibitions. APE programs include the Third Thursday Glens Falls Art Walk, Outdoor Cinema, Gallery 99, Art Cart, and Chalk Fest. Third Thursday events take place on the third Thursday of each month May through October at approximately 20 traditional and non-traditional venues downtown.

The Shirt Factory Arts and Healing Center is a historic shirt factory that now houses artists' studios, shops, galleries, healing arts and services. More than 50 artists and 13 shops and galleries are in this building at the corner of Lawrence and Cooper Streets. The building was constructed in the early 1900s by architect Ephraim Potter, and is open to the public on a regular basis. The tenants hold yearly open houses, and a celebration of things locally made called LocalFest: Stuff Made Here is held every September.

Glens Falls is also home of the Glens Falls September 11 Memorial, on the May Street side of the Glens Falls Fire Department headquarters at 134 Ridge Street. The memorial is a tribute to the lives lost on that day as well as a tribute to all first responders involved in rescue efforts at the World Trade Center and the Pentagon. The memorial consists of 12 foot, solid granite towers resembling the trade center encompassed by granite walls to resemble the Pentagon. It also incorporates a piece of steel from the World Trade Center on permanent loan from the NY/NJ Port Authority.

Print

The Post-Star is a daily newspaper printed in Glens Falls with a circulation of approximately 27,000 (30,000 on Sundays). The paper covers Glens Falls and Saratoga as well as the surrounding towns and counties of Warren, Saratoga and Washington. Established in 1895, it has been published since 1909. Writer Mark Mahoney won the 2009 Pulitzer Prize in Journalism (Editorial Writing) for his editorials on local government secrecy.

The Chronicle is a free weekly newspaper with a summer distribution up to 37,000. Circulation at other times of the year ranges from 27,000 to 31,000. Established in 1980, founder Mark Frost remains The Chronicles publisher and editor.

Radio

AM
WMML/1230
WWSC/1450

FM
WLJH/90.7
WGFR/92.7
WBLN-LP/104.9

Television

Glens Falls is part of the Albany/Schenectady/Troy television market. One low-powered station originates from Glens Falls, WNCE-CD (TV-31), broadcasting from its studios on Glen Street in downtown. Offering a variety of locally produced programs, the station's signature show is a weeknight news program, called North News 8.

Sports

Glens Falls has a tradition of minor league hockey. The highly successful Adirondack Red Wings, four-time Calder Cup champions of the American Hockey League, played in the city from 1979 to 1999. When the parent Detroit Red Wings disbanded the franchise, it was replaced by the Adirondack IceHawks of the United Hockey League, which was renamed "Frostbite" in 2004 before it folded in 2006. From 2009 to 2014, the city was the home to the AHL's Adirondack Phantoms, the principal farm team of the Philadelphia Flyers. On May 16, 2014, the Calgary Flames announced the Adirondack Flames would be their AHL affiliate. The Flames played one season before the AHL underwent a large realignment before the 2015–16 season and the Calgary Flames moved their AHL team to Stockton, California (renamed to Stockton Heat) and moved their ECHL team to Glens Falls, called the Adirondack Thunder.

Glens Falls' East Field is home to the Glens Falls Greenjackets of the Empire Football League. The Greenjackets started in 1928 and is the second oldest-active semi-pro football team in the country. The Greenjackets are 2008 & 2009 NAFL Empire Division Champions (10–0) and the 2009 NAFL North Atlantic Region Champions (14–0), and finished the season at 14–1 as the NAFL Eastern Conference Runners-up, 2009 NAFL Elite 8.

The city is also home to the Glens Falls Dragons, a baseball team playing in the Perfect Game Collegiate Baseball League, a collegiate summer baseball league. Since the team's inception in 2003 it has played at East Field.

Literary and film references

The 1982 film Basket Case was partially filmed in Glens Falls.
In 2007, the movie Love Conquers Paul was filmed at various location in Glens Falls.
 Glens Falls and the natural formation of the bedrock beneath it served as inspiration to James Fenimore Cooper in his historical novel The Last of the Mohicans.
Julia Spencer-Fleming's mystery novels are set in fictional Millers Kill, New York in the Glens Falls area.
Ian Fleming's novel The Spy Who Loved Me features scenes in Glens Falls.
In The Witch of Hebron (2010) by James Howard Kunstler, several characters visit Glens Falls.
The Rick Bass short story "Field Events", which appears in his 1994 collection Platte River, is set in Glens Falls.
Glens Falls is mentioned in Infinite Jest, by David Foster Wallace, as a metropolis bordering a nuclear wasteland known as "The Great Concavity."
Christopher Baldwin created a graphic novel on the artistic and historical resource of Glens Falls.

Recreation and sports facilities 

Glens Falls operates two public parks, most prominently City Park and Crandall Park. City Park provides green space in the City's business district and contains the public library. Crandall Park has a lowland pond, war monuments and recreation facilities bordering the city's Coles' Woods International Ski Trail system over the northern border with Queensbury. There are also many neighborhood playgrounds including The Murray Street Playground, the Mohican Street Playground, the East Field Playground, Haviland's Cove, the Montcalm Street Playground, and the Sagamore Street Playground.

The Glens Falls Civic Center opened in 1979 and hosts sports and entertainment events in downtown Glens Falls; it includes an arena for sporting events, concerts, family activities, dance, theater and trade shows as well as banquet facilities. The Civic Center includes 4,806 permanent arena seats focused on an ice hockey/basketball-type arena, but it can accommodate up to 7,800 people for concerts and other events. The arena is the home to the ECHL's Adirondack Thunder. The facility was renamed Cool Insuring Arena in 2017.

East Field is on the city's east side and is home to the Glens Falls Dragons, of the Perfect Game Collegiate Baseball League; the Greenjackets semi-pro football team, the second oldest football team in America formed in 1928; and the Glens Falls High School Indians. It was home to the Glens Falls White Sox and Glens Falls Tigers of the Eastern League, the Glens Falls Redbirds of the New York–Penn League and the Adirondack Lumberjacks of the Northeast League/Northern League East.

The Glens Falls Tennis and Swim Club is a private membership club offering recreational and competition tennis since 1965 at the city's eastern border in the town of Queensbury.

Transportation 
Air
Floyd Bennett Memorial Airport (IATA: GFL, ICAO: KGFL) in Queensbury, formerly the Warren County Airport, provides convenient access to the Glens Falls region for small and charter aircraft. For major air travel, the region is served by the Albany International Airport in Colonie, 40 miles south of Glens Falls.

Bus

The Greater Glens Falls Transit System, or GGFT for short, provides regular bus service for the city and surrounding communities. The buses originate at the Ridge Street terminal, across from City Park and City Hall. In addition to the year-round buses, the system operates seasonal trolleys to Lake George. National service is available through Trailways and Greyhound, which operates a terminal near the GGFT bus terminal, on Hudson Avenue.

Rail
Amtrak, the national passenger rail system, provides service to Glens Falls via nearby Fort Edward in the town of the same name. The daily Adirondack (Montreal-New York City) and Ethan Allen Express (Rutland, Vermont-New York City) serve the station.

Road

Interstate 87 – Bypassing Glens Falls to the west, the highway commonly known to locals as the Adirondack Northway has three exits serving Glens Falls. Exit 17N uses U.S. Route 9, and travels to Glens Falls via South Glens Falls. Exit 18 uses Main Street (Warren County Route 28), and is the exit recommended on guide signs for downtown and hospital access. It also accesses the West Glens Falls section of Queensbury. Exit 19 uses New York Route 254 northwest of the city, with access to the northern portions of the city via Glen St./Route 9, Bay Rd., and Ridge Rd./Route 9L.

U.S. Route 9 – Known as Glen Street throughout Glens Falls. Enters Glens Falls from the south on the Cooper's Cave Bridge, crossing the Hudson River from South Glens Falls. Runs through the central business district north into Queensbury. This is a historically significant corridor, once a plank stagecoach toll road to Lake George, and prior to that the military road during the French and Indian War connecting Fort Edward and Fort William Henry.

New York Route 32 enters with U.S. Route 9 from the south via the Cooper's Cave Bridge, then leaves Route 9 at Centennial Circle as it turns to the east on Warren Street. The road leaves Glens Falls to the east in the industrial district of the city, connecting the city with nearby Hudson Falls and Fort Edward. Truck traffic may bypass the downtown traffic and Centennial Circle via Oakland Street, which is designated Truck New York Route 32.

New York Route 9L starts at the intersection of U.S. Route 9 and New York State Route 32 at Centennial Circle, and travels northeast towards the town of Queensbury. The road is known as Ridge Street, becoming Ridge Road at the city line.

Glens Falls has a radial street pattern originating from its colonial settlement.

Schools and education
The city falls within two school districts, both of which are fully independent of the city government. The majority of the city falls within the Glens Falls City School District, which includes parts of the town of Queensbury.

The Glens Falls City School District operates Glens Falls High School, a middle school and four neighborhood elementary schools (Sanford Street School, Big Cross School, Jackson Heights School and Kensington Road Elementary School). Sanford Street School was closed at the end of the 2010–2011 school year.

All GFHS athletic teams carry the name "Indians" (Glens Falls Indians). The boys' basketball team won a state and federation championship in 2019. They were also a state finalist in 2003 and 2007 and a state semi-finalist in 1999. The field hockey team was state champion in 2000 and 2001 and a state finalist in 1999 and 2006. The boys' ice hockey team was state champion in 1990 and 1991; it was a finalist in 2000 and semi-finalist in 1989, 2001, 2003, 2004, and 2005. The football team won a state championship in 2016 and 2018. They were also a state finalist in 2012 and a state semi-finalist in 1993. In 2008, the school replaced its old grass football field and tennis courts with a turf field, concession stand, new bleachers and tennis courts.

The Glens Falls Common School District operates an independent public elementary school, Abraham Wing Elementary School, named for a founder of Glens Falls.
Saint Mary's–Saint Alphonsus Regional Catholic School serves children in pre-kindergarten through grade eight as a regional parochial school.

City government

Glens Falls, since incorporation as a city in 1908, has had a strong mayor charter. The city's Common Council has six members; one is elected to represent the city at large while the other five are elected from wards. The city is represented on the Warren County Board of Supervisors by five supervisors; one supervisor is elected from each Common Council ward. Such "city ward supervisors" do not have any duties in city government but have all the rights and privileges as any other member of the County Board.

Departments of the City include: Cemetery, Community, Fire, Police, Public Works, Purchasing, Recreation, Controller, Assessment, Civil Service, Clerk, Water & Sewer, and Buildings and Codes.

Religion 
While Glens Falls was originally settled by Quakers, the congregations of other early Protestant churches soon followed them. Today, many faiths have places of worship in Glens Falls, reflecting a diverse community. Active churches include:
 Christ Church – United Methodist
 Church of the Good Shepherd – Lutheran Church–Missouri Synod
 The Church of Jesus Christ of Latter-day Saints
 Church of the Messiah – Episcopal
 Congregation Shaaray Tefila – Conservative Judaism
 Faith Tabernacle – Baptist
 First Baptist Church – Baptist
 First Church of Christ – Christian Scientist
 First Presbyterian Church of Glens Falls – Presbyterian Church USA
 Free Methodist Church – Methodist
 St. Alphonsus – Roman Catholic (merged with St. Mary's)
 St. Mary's – Roman Catholic
 Temple Beth El – Reform Judaism

Regional events 
The Adirondack Balloon Festival
A balloon festival has been held in the Glens Falls area, with events at the Floyd Bennett Memorial Airport and Crandall Park, in mid to late September every year since 1973. The event draws upwards of 150,000 people over 4 days, and has been named one of the Top 100 events in North America. Originally organized by Walt Grishkot, the event is free to the public, and generally lacks commercialism.
The Adirondack Stampede
A Professional Rodeo Cowboys Association (PRCA)-sanctioned charity rodeo.
Lower Adirondack Regional Arts Council (LARAC) Festival
The LARAC June Arts Festival, held annually since 1972, is considered the first major summer event in the Glens Falls region and it draws crowds of more than 25,000. With the juried art and craft show as its centerpiece, the LARAC June Arts Festival also offers live entertainment by regional performers, food concessions by local non-profits, and activities for the whole family. It is free and open to the public, 10 am-5 pm both days and is held rain or shine.
New York State Boy's Public High School Basketball Tournament & Federation Basketball Tournament
Each March, The New York State Boys' Public High School Basketball Tournament is held at the Glens Falls Civic Center. This annual tradition has occurred since 1981. 2011 marks its 30th anniversary at the facility. The Federation Basketball Tournament of Champions are also held at the Glens Falls Civic Center.
Northcountry Microbrew Festival
The Northcountry Microbrew Festival began as a charity fund raising event to benefit the Downtown Glens Falls area. Each year, a different charity is chosen to receive the proceeds. The event takes place at the historic Queensbury Hotel in downtown Glens Falls.
Taste of the North Country
Taste of the North Country is sponsored by the Kiwanis Club of Glens Falls and features food sampling from over 35 North Country Restaurants. This annual event on the last Sunday of September also includes live music, cooking demonstrations and an apple dessert contest. In its 16 year history the event has raised more than $500,000 for the Community Service Projects of the Kiwanis Club.
Third Thursday Glens Falls Art Walk
The Third Thursday Glens Falls Art Walk artists' receptions are held at various locations in downtown Glens Falls in the evening on the third Thursday of each month during the summer and fall.

Notable people

 Joseph Bruno – former Majority Leader of New York State Senate; born in Glens Falls
 George H. Chase (1843-1918) - Member of the 1st Arizona State Legislature.
 Bradshaw Crandell - illustrator and Hollywood portrait artist; born in Glens Falls
 Douglass Crockwell (1904-1968) - artist and filmmaker (Glens Falls Sequence, 1946); moved to Glens Falls in 1933
 John Alden Dix – 41st governor of New York (1911–1913), born in Glens Falls
 Laura Don – born Anna Laura Fish at Glens Falls, actress-manager and playwright
 "Hacksaw" Jim Duggan – professional wrestler of Mid-South, WWF and WCW fame, Glens Falls native
 Lisa Eichhorn – actress, born in Glens Falls
 Warren Angus Ferris (1810–1873) – explorer of the American West and early surveyor of Dallas, Texas
 George Fitch – member of the Wisconsin State Senate
 Jimmer Fredette – former combo guard for Brigham Young University's basketball team and consensus 2011 college player of the year; Glens Falls native
 Joseph Girard III – college basketball player for the Syracuse Orange
 Ferris Greenslet – editor of the Atlantic Monthly (1902–07), born in Glens Falls
 Carlyle Harris – convicted murderer; executed in 1893 for poisoning his wife
 Lionel Hitchman – professional hockey player, 1929 Stanley Cup champion, died in Glens Falls
 Charles Evans Hughes – Governor of New York (1907–1910), presidential candidate (1916), and Chief Justice of the United States (1930–1941); born in Glens Falls
 Thomas M. Jacobs – Olympic Nordic skier
 Frederick Avery Johnson – Member of Congress, Village President
 Dave LaPoint – retired Major League Baseball pitcher and 1982 World Series champion; owner of Dave LaPoint's Pitchers bar formerly on South Street; Glens Falls High School graduate
 Betty Little – State Senator serving 45th Senate District (includes Glens Falls); born in Glens Falls but resides in Queensbury
 Rob Loughan – entrepreneur and investor
 Peter Mahovlich – retired All-Star hockey player; was on four Stanley Cup-winning teams; member of Canada's Sports Hall of Fame; resides in Glens Falls
 Barry Melrose – former head coach of the NHL's Tampa Bay Lightning and Los Angeles Kings, television commentator, former co-owner of Adirondack Frostbite UHL team and former coach of Adirondack Red Wings AHL team, both of which were based in Glens Falls
 Lorrie Moore – O. Henry Award-winning author
 Scott Murphy – U.S. Representative (2009–2011) for New York's 20th congressional district, which includes Glens Falls; Murphy also resides in Glens Falls
 Algernon Sidney Paddock – Secretary of Nebraska Territory and Governor of Nebraska; United States Senator; born in Glens Falls
 Dave Palmer – retired Major League Baseball pitcher
 Johnny Podres – pitcher for the Brooklyn and Los Angeles Dodgers; retired to Glens Falls region
 Edward C. Prescott – 2004 Nobel Prize in Economics, Glens Falls High School class of 1958
 Edgar Preston Richardson – art historian and director of the Detroit Institute of Arts and Winterthur Museum, Garden and Library
 Ed Reulbach – MLB pitcher with the Chicago Cubs during the early 1900s; 1907 and 1908 World Series champion; died in Glens Falls
 Robert Rheinlander – noted architect and designer of several prominent Glens Falls buildings
 Rochelle Saidel - author, activist, and founder of the Remember the Women Institute
 Powel J. Smith – member of the New York State Assembly, City Chamberlain
 Gerald B. H. Solomon – United States Representative from New York (1979–1999)
 Kate White – former editor-in-chief of Cosmopolitan Magazine; identifies Glens Falls as her hometown

Sister cities 
 – Saga, Japan

References

External links

 City of Glens Falls official website
 City Charter and Code online
 Greater Glens Falls Transit Bus Information
 

 
Glens Falls metropolitan area
Cities in New York (state)
New York (state) populated places on the Hudson River
Cities in Warren County, New York